Romi Brown (born 25 August 2002) is an Australian artistic gymnast having represented Australia at the Commonwealth Games 2022 winning a silver medal in the team event.  She also represented her country at the  World Artistic Gymnastics Championships in Liverpool the same year.

She won multiple gold medals as a Junior 15 International at the 2017 WAG Australian Championships.  She placed third in the all-around as a Senior International at the 2022 WAG Australian Championships.

References

2002 births
Living people
Australian female artistic gymnasts
Gymnasts at the 2022 Commonwealth Games
Commonwealth Games medallists in gymnastics
Commonwealth Games silver medallists for Australia
People from Malvern, Victoria
Sportspeople from Melbourne
Medallists at the 2022 Commonwealth Games